The 2006 Rutgers Scarlet Knights campaign was considered by many to be the breakout season for the Rutgers football team. Led by Draddy Trophy winning senior fullback Brian Leonard, sophomore quarterback Mike Teel, senior defensive captain and two time national defensive player of the week defensive tackle Ramel Meekins, sophomore halfback Ray Rice, sophomore wide receiver Tiquan Underwood, junior defensive tackle Eric Foster, and junior kicker Jeremy Ito, Rutgers finished the season ranked 12th in the Associated Press and Coaches polls, won eleven of thirteen games, and recorded the first bowl game win in school history.

The team started off the season going undefeated through nine games, including a dramatic win over then-3rd ranked Louisville, which was highlighted by kicker Jeremy Ito's last minute field goal to seal the win. After they were defeated by both West Virginia and Cincinnati, they received an invitation to play Kansas State in the inaugural Texas Bowl. Rutgers defeated Kansas State 37-10 for the first bowl game win in school history. Halfback Ray Rice was named the game's MVP and ran for 170 yards and one touchdown in twenty-four carries. Due to his tremendous 2006 season, in which he ran for 1,794 yards and scored twenty touchdowns, Rice won Big East Player of the Year honors. He also finished seventh in Heisman Trophy voting and was a finalist for the Maxwell Award.

Schedule

Rankings

References

Rutgers
Rutgers Scarlet Knights football seasons
Texas Bowl champion seasons
Rutgers Scarlet Knights football